George Montgomery may refer to:

George Montgomery (actor) (1916–2000), American actor
George Leslie Montgomery (c. 1727–1787), Irish Member of Parliament
George Montgomery (set decorator) (1899–1951), American set decorator
George Thomas Montgomery (1847–1907), American Roman Catholic prelate
George Montgomery (basketball) (born 1962), American basketball player
George Montgomery (bishop) (1562–1621), Church of Ireland bishop
George Montgomery (drag racer), American drag racing driver
George Montgomery (pathologist) (1905–1993), Scottish pathologist
George F. Montgomery Jr. (born 1933), American politician
George F. Montgomery Sr. (1909–1981), member of the Michigan House of Representatives
George Washington Montgomery (1804–1841), American Spanish-born writer, translator and diplomat

See also
George Montgomerie (1712–1766), MP for Ipswich
George Montgomerie, 15th Earl of Eglinton (1848–1919)